Augustyn Bloch (13 August 1929 in Grudziądz – 6 April 2006 in Warsaw) was a Polish composer and organist, student of Feliks Rączkowski and Tadeusz Szeligowski. He was an active concert organist, conducted his own music, and wrote music for the Polish Radio Theater.

Selected works 

 Piano variations Karol Szymanowski in memoriam (1953)
 Concertino for violin solo, string orchestra, piano, and percussion (1958)
 Meditations for soprano solo, organs, and percussion (1961)
 Oczekiwanie (Waiting), a ballet (1963)
 Dialogi per biolino et orchestra (1969)
 Gilgamesh (1969)
 Enfiando (1970)
 Warstwy czasu (Layers of Time) for 15 string instruments (1978)
 Anenaiki (1979)

External links 
 Michael F. Runowski: Polnische Orgelmusik nach 1945. Saarbrücken: Verlag Dr. Müller (2009). 
 Augustyn Bloch on culture.pl

1929 births
2006 deaths
People from Grudziądz
Polish composers
Polish organists
Male organists
20th-century organists
20th-century male musicians